Redondesco is a comune (municipality) in the Province of Mantua in the Italian region Lombardy, located about  southeast of Milan and about  west of Mantua.

The municipality of Redondesco contains the frazione (subdivision) Bologne.

Redondesco borders the following municipalities: Acquanegra sul Chiese, Gazoldo degli Ippoliti, Marcaria, Mariana Mantovana, Piubega.

Demographic evolution

References

Cities and towns in Lombardy